Insull may refer to:

 Insull Utilities Investment Inc.
 Insull, Kentucky
 Leonard Insull (1883–1974), figurinist
 Samuel Insull (1859–1938), investor